This is the list of Indian films that are released in 2020

Box office collection 
The list of highest-grossing Indian films released in 2020, by worldwide box office gross revenue, are as follows:

Lists of Indian films of 2020 
 
 List of Assamese films of 2020
 List of Bollywood films of 2020
 List of Gujarati films of 2020
 List of Indian Bengali films of 2020
 List of Kannada films of 2020
 List of Malayalam films of 2020
 List of Marathi films of 2020
 List of Punjabi films of 2020
 List of Tamil films of 2020
 List of Telugu films of 2020
 List of Tulu films of 2020

References

 
 
 
2020 in Indian cinema
Lists of 2020 films by country or language
2020